Blue Stripe (foaled October 27, 2017) is a dual-hemisphere Argentine-bred multiple Graded Stakes winning Thoroughbred racehorse. Her graded wins include the Group 1 Gran Premio Criadores in Argentina and the Grade I Clement L. Hirsch Stakes in 2022 at Del Mar in Southern California.

Background
Blue Stripe is a bay mare, bred by La Manija in Argentina and owned by Mexican Jose Cerillo of Lomas de Chapulpepec's Pozo de Luna. Blue Stripe's sire is the Argentine bred Equal Stripes who has provided three winners of the Group 1 Gran Premio Nacional (Argentine Derby) among his progeny. He led the Argentine general sire list in 2020. His dam Blues for Sale was a Group winner in Argentina over 1200-1600 metre distances. Blue Stripe is a half-sister to Blue Prize, the 2019 Breeders' Cup Distaff winner at Santa Anita.

In Argentina, Blue Stripe was trained by Nicolas Martin Ferro and ridden by jockey Pavon Eduardo Ortega in all her races. In the US she is trained by Marcelo Polanco.

Racing Career

Argentina
Blue Stripe began her career October 20, 2020 in "The Angel Comanche", a Maiden event for three-year-old fillies at Hipódromo Argentino de Palermo winning it by half a length over his owner's co-entry Serenata Huasteca in 1:37:98. A month later she was entered in the Group 1 Gran Premio Enrique Acebal over 2000 meters on the turf track at San Isidro Race Course and found the class rise of the event challenging staying up near to the leaders and just fading to finish a creditable third beaten by 3 lengths to the fast finishing Bellagamba. Staying at San Isidro, Blue Stripe ran once more in the Group 1 Copa de Plata-Roberto Vasquez Mansilla Internacional on December 19, 2020. Facing a field of sixteen, Blue Stripe again bounced out into the leading pack and was third down the back stretch. Staying along the rail as the field entered the straight, Blue Stripe managed to get a split and surged to challenge the eventual winner Elvas, but was found short and was overtaken close to home to finish third.

After a short break, Blue Stripe resumed on Feb 5, 2021 in the Listed Clasico Haras Argentinos on the dirt. Starting at odds of 19/5 Blue Stripe defeated the favorite Special Dubai by a  length in a fast time of 1:58.82. A month later on Mar 6, 2021 in the Group 2 Clasico Arturo R. Y Arturo Bullrich Blue Stripe as the 3/10 odds-on favorite produced a scintillating performance thrashing her four rivals by eight lengths. 

In her last race in Argentina, Blue Stripe was entered to run in the Group 1 Gran Premio Criadores, designated as a Breeders' Cup Challenge event for the Breeders' Cup Distaff whose winners receive free berths and fees paid into a corresponding race for the Breeders' Cup World Championships. Blue Stripe started well in a field of eleven, staying off the rail in third behind pacesetter Kalivia, who took the field through the half mile in 46.40 and the mile in 1:34.37. As Kalivia faded, Blue Stripe moved into first along the rail, but was quickly engaged by the three-year-old Mahagonny, the 5-1 second choice. As the two fillies battled in the stretch, the three-year-old 84/1 longshot Soviet Catch mounted a furious drive on the outside in the final furlong, passing Mahagonny at the wire for second, but ran out of ground to collar Blue Stripe.

With four victories and twice third, Blue Stripe earned an equivalent of US$41,882 in her six starts in Argentina.

United States 
On November 6, Blue Stripe now trained by Marcelo Polanco started in the Breeders' Cup Distaff to Del Mar. She faced a very strong field headlined by Letruska (Apple Blossom, Ogden Phipps, Personal Ensign, Spinster Stakes), Malathaat (Kentucky Oaks, Alabama Stakes), Clairiere (Cotillion), Shedaresthedevil (Kentucky Oaks, Clement L. Hirsch Stakes) and Royal Flag (Zenyatta Stakes). Blue Stripe ridden by British Champion Jockey Lanfranco Dettori got shuffled shortly after the start, angled to the inside, steered off the rail backstretch, moved
closer outside a rival, went three wide into the far turn, five wide into the stretch and failed to threaten around the bend and weakened in the stretch run to finish seventh to longshot Japanese-owned Marche Lorraine.

2022: five-year-old season  
Blue Stripe remained in California, preparing for her five-year-old season.

After a lengthy winter break, Blue Stripe was entered in the Grade 2 Santa Margarita Stakes at Santa Anita on 30 April. The 11/10 favorite, Miss Bigly, took the lead with a five-wide sweep into the stretch at the eighth pole and looked home free in the -mile event. Then Blue Stripe, ridden by Tyler Baze, surged even wider and went by Miss Bigly about 75 yards from the wire to win by a length in a time of 1:50.52. Marcelo Polanco said, "She was so fresh, she was ready to do something. I asked the connections if it was OK to run her in here, and they said, 'Whatever you think.' We just went for it."  Jockey Tyler Baze pointed out, "I hadn't been on her, but I heard some reports that said she was ready and working tremendous. That's what my agent told me this morning. I didn't know what kind of gas pedal I had under me until the three-eighths pole. I asked her, and she ran up to 'em so quick, it caught me off guard. I had to tap on the brakes, but even with doing that, when I asked her again she accelerated and came home."

On June 18, Blue Stripe faced five other entrants in the Grade 2 Santa Maria Stakes at Santa Anita. She pulled a bit into the first turn, moved to the inside around that bend, tipped out and took aim two and then three wide into the stretch, and finished well but could not get to favorite Private Mission and was  lengths short.

On August 6, Blue Stripe garnered her first Grade 1 win in the US in the Clement L. Hirsch Stakes at Del Mar. The -mile event developed just as trainer Marcelo Polanco and Hector Berrios drew it up. Familiar foe Private Mission and Shedaresthedevil, who had won this event last year, went at a lively pace on the front end, Private Mission completing the first quarter-mile in :23.18, Blue Stripe raced easily in third position of the five entries. Berrios recalled, "The race went exactly as we planned it. We wanted to sit behind the speed horses, then go get them late." As the field headed to the second turn, Shedaresthedevil challenged Private Mission for the lead. When Shedaresthedevil took over, the race was looked similar to the previous year's edition. However, Blue Stripe, the 5/1 third choice, ranged up outside of Shedaresthedevil, edging ahead turning for home, got clear of the favorite by the eighth pole, and scored by  lengths in 1:42.97.

On November 5 in the Breeders' Cup Distaff, Blue Stripe finished second by a nose to Malathaat in a three-way photo finish with Clairiere finishing third.

Statistics

Legend:

 
 

Notes:

An (*) asterisk after the odds means Blue Stripe was the post-time favorite.

Pedigree

References

2017 racehorse births
Racehorses trained in the United States
Thoroughbred family 16-g
American Grade 1 Stakes winners
Racehorses bred in Argentina
Racehorses trained in Argentina